Rene Mark Nelson Ranger (born 30 September 1986) is a New Zealand rugby union player who plays for  in the Bunnings NPC. Ranger plays the positions of wing and centre.

He made his debut for New Zealand on 26 June 2010 after a superb season with the Blues.
He is known for his aggressive style of play and strong running.

Career

Provincial
Ranger made his debut for the Northland Taniwha on 22 July 2006 against North Harbour. He went on to play a further nine games for the team that season and continued to play for the union. Ranger grew up playing for Wellsford, and is currently the club's first and only All Black.

Super Rugby
In 2007 Ranger was selected as a member of the Blues Wider Training Group. Following his form for the Taniwha he was signed by the Blues for 2009. Ranger made his Super 14 debut in the Blues 13 February victory over the Western Force in Perth. Ranger was suspended for one match following a late and high tackle in the Blues 2009 loss to the Bulls in Pretoria.

Ranger returned to the side in 2016 and was named on the bench for the season opener against the Highlanders.

Sevens
In 2006 Ranger was selected by Gordon Tietjens to represent the  New Zealand Sevens team at the Dubai and South Africa tournaments in December. In 2007 he was again selected to play for the New Zealand sevens team in Dubai and South Africa. Having failed to win selection in a Super 14 squad for 2008, Ranger continued to represent New Zealand in sevens, playing in the first four tournaments of the year before joining back up with Northland for the Air New Zealand Cup.

International
Ranger was selected for the Junior All Blacks on the back of his form for the Blues in the 2009 season.

In June 2010, Ranger was called into the All Blacks training squad alongside Ben Smith as injury cover. 
He then made his test debut off the bench in the second test against South Africa, with his performance standing out enough to be named in the All Blacks squad for the Tri Nations. Ranger scored a try during his second test for the All Blacks against The Springboks, on 17 July 2010 as the All Blacks won 31–17 at the Westpac Stadium in Wellington.

After a strong start to the 2013 Super Rugby season, Ranger was named in the All Blacks wider training squad and came off the bench in the first two tests against France before starting the final test.

Abroad
Later, Ranger signed a contract with Montpellier. All Blacks Coach Steve Hansen stated that in spite of this he would have selected Rene Ranger for the Rugby Championship. However, Ranger made himself unavailable for the All Blacks. He cited personal reasons for withdrawing from the squad. Instead Ranger captained Northland in the ITM Cup. Northland performed poorly through the season, ending up second from the bottom of the table with two wins, a draw and seven losses.

After a successful season with Montpellier, with Montpellier reaching the semi finals of the Top 14 but being beaten by Castres at Lille, Ranger was invited to play for the Barbarians against an England 15 at Twickenham. Although he didn't score he played very well, and set up one of Hosea Gear's tries - the final result was Barbarians 39, England 29.

After two seasons with, and initial resistance from Montpellier, Ranger gained an early release from his contract and announced his intention to return to New Zealand to play for North Harbour in the 2015 ITM Cup and rejoin the Blues for the 2016 season. He also focused on pushing for an All Blacks recall. His return to New Zealand rugby was hampered by slow recovery from neck surgery, which precluded his participation in the North Harbour ITM Cup campaign.

In 2020, Ranger signed on to play for the Colorado Raptors of Major League Rugby. However, with the suspension of the season due to the ongoing COVID-19 pandemic, Ranger returned to New Zealand.

Return to New Zealand 
Ranger re-signed with Northland for the 2020 Mitre 10 Cup season. Despite being unfancied by many, Northland performed well to make the Championship final where they fell 36-24 to Hawke's Bay. Ranger was praised during the season for numerous good performances as part of Northland's run.

After injuries to George Bridge and Manasa Mataele, Ranger earned a place in the Crusaders side for the 2021 Super Rugby Aotearoa season as injury cover. Upon signing, Ranger commented that "chucking on the red jersey was a bit intimidating at times" in reference to his long association with the Blues. However Ranger did not play a game during the 2021 season.

In Round 5 of the 2021 Bunnings NPC Ranger played his 100th game for  against  in Whangārei in 38–28 win for the Taniwha.

Controversy
Ranger was charged with assault following an altercation north of Auckland on 18 April 2009. The New Zealand Rugby Union suspended him for one match, and he was officially warned and directed to complete an alcohol counselling programme. However, at trial in 2012 Ranger was found not guilty of assault.

References

External links
itsrugby.co.uk profile

1986 births
Living people
Blues (Super Rugby) players
American Raptors players
Crusaders (rugby union) players
Hino Red Dolphins players
Montpellier Hérault Rugby players
New Zealand international rugby sevens players
New Zealand international rugby union players
New Zealand sportspeople of Cook Island descent
New Zealand people of English descent
New Zealand rugby union players
Northland rugby union players
Rugby union centres
Rugby union players from Whangārei
Rugby union wings
Stade Rochelais players
Sunwolves players